Enhalus is a monotypic genus of marine flowering plants.  The sole species is Enhalus acoroides. Enhalus is a large seagrass native to coastal waters of the tropical Indian and Western Pacific Oceans. It is the only species of seagrass that does aerial surface pollination in which the pollen and the styles remain dry. Enhalus is surface pollinated with male flowers that detach from the plant to float on the surface until they reach a female flower where pollination can occur. Enhalus acoroides is considered a slow-growing, "climax" species.

Description

Enhalus acoroides massive rhizomes (1.5 cm in diameter) help it stay anchored in soft mud substrates, withstanding wave action and tidal currents. it has long strap like leaves (30–150 cm) which make up a significant volume of total plant biomass of shallow water seagrass beds, because of the large structure of the leaves and where they are in the water column, they provide greater surfaces for Epibiont organisms to inhabit. Fruit are round and large (4–6 cm in diameter) with dark, ribbed skin and 6-7 white seeds. The male plant bears a single pedunculate inflorescence or stem containing clusters of flowers, each is highly reduced in form to a small free floating device. Female Enhalus acoroides bears only a single inflorescence, but the peduncle of a female flower is much longer.

Distribution and habitat

Enhalus acoroides is a littoral species living in shallow soft substrates like muddy or sand-flats and coral substrates depending the region of growth. It can be found as far east as Papua New Guinea and can range from the Red Sea south to northern Mozambique in the Indian Ocean. It can be found in mixed meadows of seagrasses comprising 90% of the meadow biomass mainly with Thallassia hemprichii.  it can also be found living in isolated areas. Enhalus acoroides grows best just above the level of mean low water springs and grows to generally 4 meters deep.

Reproduction

Enhalus acoroides is dioecious and able to reproduce sexually and asexually. Enhalus acoroides create small isolated patches containing 25 to 200 shoots through lateral rhizome spreading. It can also produce pollen like other seagrasses but it is unique in that it is the only species of seagrasses that surface pollinates. During this process, the male flower will break off from the spathe and rise to the surface where it has numerous flowers inside its hydrophobic inflorescences. Once at the surface it will release its pollen to a female inflorescence where it has reached the surface of the water by means of an elongated stalk surface. The developing fruit is drawn under the water to finish ripening. Flowering is a year round phenomenon and the amount of flowers being produced are strongly related to variations in mean water temperatures.

References

External links 

Images  of Enhalus at AlgaeBase

Hydrocharitaceae
Seagrass
Hydrocharitaceae genera
Monotypic Alismatales genera
Dioecious plants